Hohepa or Hōhepa may refer to:

People
Hohepa or Hōhepa is the Māori transliteration of the name Joseph, and is a common given name and surname in New Zealand.

Given name
 Hohepa (Hep) Cahill (b. 1986), New Zealand rugby league player
 Hohepa (Joe) Harawira (fl 1953 – 2017), Māori kaumatua
 Hohepa Komene, New Zealand weightlifter
 Hohepa Malcolm, New Zealand musician
 Hohepa (Joe) Rātima, New Zealand rugby union and rugby league player
 Hohepa Tamehana, New Zealand composer
 Hohepa Te Toiroa Tahuriorangi (b. 1995), New Zealand rugby union player
 Hōhepa Te Umuroa (1820? – 1847), Māori chieftain

Surname
 Annabelle Hohepa, New Zealand rugby league player
 Carla Hohepa (b. 1985), New Zealand rugby union player
 Lani Hohepa, New Zealand gymnast
 Margie Kahukura Hohepa (b. 1960), New Zealand academic
 Max Hohepa, New Zealand musician
 Patu Hohepa, New Zealand academic
 Thompson Hohepa, New Zealand musician

Fictional characters
 Elvis Hohepa, a character in New Zealand television comedy series Seven Periods with Mr Gormsby

Other uses
 Hōhepa, opera by New Zealand composer Jenny McLeod
 Hohepa Trust, a New Zealand charitable organisation
 Hohepa homes, educational facilities for children with learning difficulties, set up by the Hohepa Trust
 Hohepa Home School, a special needs school in Poraiti, New Zealand
 Te Kura o Hato Hohepa Te Kamura, a school in Waitaruke, New Zealand
 Shirley and Grace Hohepa Home, former name of Hackthorne Gardens, Christchurch, New Zealand

See also
 Joe (disambiguation)
 Joseph (disambiguation)

Masculine given names
Māori given names
Māori-language surnames